The marine waters of the Houtman Abrolhos, an island chain off the coast of Western Australia, have been recorded as containing 260 species of benthic algae. This figure comprises 178 species of red algae (Rhodophyta), 50 species of brown algae (Phaeophyta) and 32 species of green algae (Chlorophyta). Both temperate and tropical species occur there. 
This is a list of algae of the Houtman Abrolhos:

Rhodophyta

Phaeophyta

Chlorophyta

References

Algae
Houtman Abrolhos
Algae of the Houtman Abrolhos